Oh Promise Me is a song with music by Reginald De Koven and lyrics by Clement Scott.  The song was written in 1887 and first published in 1889 by G. Schirmer, Inc. as an art song.  De Koven may have based the melody partly on a song composed by Stanislao Gastaldon, "Musica Proibita".  In 1890, De Koven wrote his most successful comic opera, Robin Hood.  After opening night, the contralto playing Alan-a-Dale, Jessie Bartlett Davis, demanded a song to better show off her voice, threatening to walk out of the production.  De Koven inserted "Oh Promise Me" into the score for her.

The sheet music sold over a million copies in 1890 and continued to gain popularity for several decades, being performed by many artists.  The song remains popular as a wedding song both in America and in the UK.

Lyrics
Oh, promise me that someday you and I
Will take our love together to some sky
Where we can be alone and faith renew,
And find the hollows where those flowers grew,
Those first sweet violets of early spring,
Which come in whispers, thrill us both, and sing
Of love unspeakable that is to be;
Oh, promise me! Oh, promise me!

Oh, promise me that you will take my hand,
The most unworthy in this lonely land,
And let me sit beside you in your eyes,
Seeing the vision of our paradise,
Hearing God's message while the organ rolls
Its mighty music to our very souls,
No love less perfect than a life with thee;
Oh, promise me! Oh, promise me!

Use in film and television
The song has made many appearances in films and on television shows where weddings or funerals are taking place - Edith Bunker sings it a wedding for two people from the rest home where she worked in a season eight episode of All in the Family, Eunice sings it at a family wedding in season one of Mama's Family, and it is performed at Diana's wedding in Anne of Green Gables: The Sequel.
Julie Andrews performs the song in the black comedy film, S.O.B. (1981) directed by Blake Edwards.

References

External links
Sheet Music for "Oh promise me", G. Schirmer, Inc., 1889.

1889 songs
Parlor songs
Songs from musicals
Art songs
Songs written by Clement Scott